Essikado-Ketan  is one of the constituencies represented in the Parliament of Ghana. It elects one Member of Parliament (MP) by the first past the post system of election. Essikado-Ketan is located in the  Sekondi Takoradi Metropolitan Assembly of the Western Region of Ghana. The current Member of Parliament is Hon. Joe Ghartey.

Boundaries
The seat is located within STMA of the Western Region of Ghana. It was formed prior to the 2004 December presidential and parliamentary elections by the division of the old Sekondi constituency into the new Essikado-Ketan and Sekondi constituencies.

Members of Parliament

Elections

See also
List of Ghana Parliament constituencies

References 

Parliamentary constituencies in the Western Region (Ghana)
Western Region (Ghana)